Eugene Wettstone (July 15, 1913 – July 30, 2013), was an American gymnastics coach, known as the "Dean of Collegiate Gymnastics Coaches", for leading Pennsylvania State University to a record nine N.C.A.A. championships in the sport, and for coaching the United States men's teams in the 1948 and 1956 Summer Olympics.

Early life
Eugene "Gene" Wettstone was born July 15, 1913 West Hoboken, New Jersey (what is today Union City, New Jersey).

Career
Wettstone took up gymnastics at a Swiss social club and attended the University of Iowa on a gymnastics scholarship. He won Big Ten titles on the pommel horse and the high bar and in the all-around as a senior in 1937. He graduated with bachelor's and master's degrees in physical education.

Wettstone was the head coach of the men's gymnastics team at Pennsylvania State University from 1939 to 1976. He led the Penn State Nittany Lions gymnasts to nine national championships. He also coached the United States men's gymnastics teams at the 1948 and 1956 Summer Olympics.

Wettstone was inducted into the United States Gymnastics Hall of Fame in 1963.

Personal life
Wettstone married Eleanor Keen in 1937 in Iowa City.

Wettsone died at age 100 in State College, Pennsylvania, in July 2013.

References

1913 births
2013 deaths
American gymnastics coaches
American gymnasts
Iowa Hawkeyes men's gymnasts
Penn State Nittany Lions men's gymnastics coaches
Sportspeople from Union City, New Jersey
American centenarians
Men centenarians
People from Union City, New Jersey